Arrabbiata sauce, or sugo all'arrabbiata in Italian (arabbiata in Romanesco dialect), is a spicy sauce for pasta made from garlic, tomatoes, and dried red chili peppers cooked in olive oil. The sauce originates from the Lazio region, and particularly from the city of Rome.

Origin of the name
Arrabbiata literally means "angry" in Italian; in Romanesco dialect the adjective arabbiato denotes a characteristic (in this case spiciness) pushed to excess. In Rome, in fact, any food cooked in a pan with a lot of oil, garlic and chili so as to provoke a strong thirst, is called arabbiato (e.g. "broccoli arabbiati").

History

The invention of the dish dates back to the 1950s and 1960s, at a time when hot (meaning here spicy or peppery)  food was in vogue in Roman cuisine. The dish has been celebrated several times in Italian movies, notably in Marco Ferreri's La Grande Bouffe (1973) and Federico Fellini's Roma (1972).

Ingredients
The main ingredients are peeled tomatoes, garlic, plenty of cayenne chili peppers, salt and extra virgin olive oil. Sometimes grated parmesan and pecorino romano cheese are added to the pasta.

See also
 Peperoncino
 List of Italian dishes

References

Sources

Cuisine of Lazio
Italian sauces
Pasta dishes
Spicy foods
Tomato sauces